The 1947 Columbia Lions football team was an American football team that represented the Columbia University during the 1947 college football season.  In its 18th season under head coach Lou Little, the team compiled a 7–2 record, was ranked No. 20 in the final AP Poll, and outscored opponents by a total of 170 to 113.

Columbia's victory over No. 6 Army on October 25, 1947, broke the Cadets' 32-game unbeaten streak dating back to November 1943.

Columbia end Bill Swiacki was a consensus first-team All-American; he also finished eighth in the 1947 voting for the Heisman Trophy.

Schedule

References

Columbia
Columbia Lions football seasons
Columbia Lions football